Fear is a 2020 Bulgarian drama film directed by Ivaylo Hristov. It was selected as the Bulgarian entry for the Best International Feature Film at the 94th Academy Awards.

Synopsis
In a Bulgarian village near the Turkish border, an unemployed schoolteacher befriends a refugee from Mali.

Reviews
Dennis Harvey, writing for Variety, said the movie was "a disarming, deadpan comedy of xenophobia and resistance."

Cast
 Svetlana Yancheva as Svetla
 Michael Flemming as Bamba

See also
 List of submissions to the 94th Academy Awards for Best International Feature Film
 List of Bulgarian submissions for the Academy Award for Best International Feature Film

References

External links
 

2020 films
2020 drama films
Films about refugees
Films about immigration
Films about racism
Bulgarian drama films
2020s Bulgarian-language films